Magic City is a prominent strip club in Atlanta, founded in 1985 and currently owned by Michael “Magic” Barney.

Hip hop and rap ties
Described by Dan Gartland of Sports Illustrated as a "legendary strip club that should be familiar to anyone who knows anything about rap music", Magic City has well-documented ties with the trap and hip hop scene. It was partially responsible for launching the careers of Future and Migos. DJ Esco worked at Magic City. Magic City has hosted performances with Young Thug, Future and 2 Chainz. DC the Brain Supreme of Tag Team worked at Magic City when he released the hit "Whoomp! (There It Is)".

In popular culture
Several rap and hip-hop songs mention Magic City, including "Strip Club" by The 2 Live Crew, "Magic City Monday" by Jeezy and "Magic" by Future. The reference to "Monday" is because Magic City is "supposedly the Holy Grail of Atlanta strip clubs on Monday nights". In July 2015, GQ released a documentary Magic City about the strip club, directed by Lauren Greenfield. Late 2018, Drake collaborated with Magic City to create the "Scorpion City" merchandise collection.

Notable visitors and events
In addition to the artists mentioned in the § Hip hop and rap ties section, Magic City has been visited by 2Pac and Biggie, and Michael Jordan. In November 2018, Magic City was temporarily refashioned as "Future City" to celebrate Future's thirty-fifth birthday, and was visited by him, Drake, Lil Yachty, Jacquees, Pastor Troy, and others. Drake allegedly had an armored truck deliver $100,000 in cash to the strip club. In December 2018, Atlanta United FC players celebrated their MLS Cup victory at Magic City.

Magic City's food menu includes "Louwill Lemon Pepper BBQ" chicken wings, named after professional basketball player Lou Williams, who played for the Atlanta Hawks (2012–2014). During the COVID-19 pandemic in 2020, he was on an approved absence from the NBA Bubble to attend the funeral of a family friend in Atlanta. Afterwards, he visited Magic City, where rapper Jack Harlow posted a picture on Instagram of him and Williams at the club. Williams, who said he was at the club for food, was required by the NBA to undergo a 10-day quarantine before re-entering the bubble.

See also

 Clermont Lounge
 List of strip clubs

References

External links
 

Entertainment companies established in 1985
Culture of Atlanta
1985 establishments in Georgia (U.S. state)
Strip clubs in the United States